The Southwest Conference men's basketball tournament, also called the SWC Classic, was the conference championship tournament in men's basketball for the Southwest Conference. The tournament was held annually between 1976 and 1996, after which the Southwest Conference was dissolved.

The winner of the tournament was guaranteed a spot in the NCAA basketball tournament each year.

Tournament champions by year

Championships by school

Television coverage

See also 
Big 12 men's basketball tournament
SEC men's basketball tournament
Conference USA men's basketball tournament
Southwest Conference women's basketball tournament

References 

 1993-94 Southwest Conference Men's Basketball media guide
 2008-09 Texas Longhorns Men's Basketball Media Guide